State Route 273 (SR 273) is a state highway in the U.S. state of California that serves as a business loop of Interstate 5 that travels directly through the downtown districts of Anderson and Redding in Shasta County.

SR 273 was part of former U.S. Route 99. In 2007 an effort was begun to have this segment signed as "Historic Route 99". Supporters hope to have black-and-white historical Route 99 signs up by October. They will be placed from North Market Street in Redding down to where Interstate 5 meets Highway 273 south of Anderson.

Route description

SR 273 begins just south of Anderson at an interchange with Interstate 5. The roadway then parallels I-5 northeast into central Anderson. Upon exiting a suburban area, the route enters farmland, while paralleling the Sacramento River. The roadway then enters suburban Redding, where it turns away from the Sacramento River and zigzags along local roads through downtown, where it meets State Route 299. Upon exiting downtown, SR 273 crosses the Sacramento River and meets its northern terminus at Interstate 5 in the suburbs of Redding.

SR 273 is part of the National Highway System, a network of highways that are considered essential to the country's economy, defense, and mobility by the Federal Highway Administration.

Major intersections

See also

References

External links

California Highways: Route 273
California @ AARoads.com - State Route 273
Caltrans: Route 273 highway conditions

273
State Route 273
U.S. Route 99
Redding, California